Epicharmus of Kos or Epicharmus Comicus or Epicharmus Comicus Syracusanus, thought to have lived between c. 550 and c. 460 BC, was a Greek dramatist and philosopher who is often credited with being one of the first comic writers, having originated the Doric or Sicilian comedic form.

Literary evidence
Most of the information about Epicharmus comes from the writings of Athenaeus, Suda and Diogenes Laërtius, although fragments and comments come up in a host of other ancient authors as well.  The standard edition of his fragments was made by Kaibel (1890) to which there has been various additions and emendments. There have also been some papyrus finds of longer sections of text, but these are often so full of holes that it is difficult to make sense of them. Plato mentions Epicharmus in his dialogue Gorgias and in Theaetetus.  In the latter, Socrates refers to Epicharmus as "the prince of Comedy", Homer as "the prince of Tragedy", and both as "great masters of either kind of poetry". Aristotle (Poetics 5.1449b5) writes that he and Phormis invented comic plots (μῦθοι, muthoi). 

The 12th-century philosopher Constantine of Nicaea cites Epicharmus.

Life
All of his biographical information should be treated as suspect. Epicharmus' birthplace is not known, but late and fairly unreliable ancient commentators suggest a number of alternatives.  The Suda (E 2766) records that he was either Syracusan by birth or from the Sikanian city of Krastos. Diogenes Laërtius (VIII 78) records that Epicharmus was born in Astypalea, the ancient capital of Kos on the Bay of Kamari, near modern-day Kefalos.  Diogenes Laërtius also records that Epicharmus' father was the prominent physician Helothales, who moved the family to Megara in Sicily, when Epicharmus was just a few months old.  Although raised according to the Asclepiad tradition of his father, as an adult Epicharmus became a follower of Pythagoras.

It is most likely that sometime after 484 BC, he lived in Syracuse, and worked as a poet for the tyrants Gelo and Hiero I.  The subject matter of his poetry covered a broad range, from exhortations against intoxication and laziness to such unorthodox topics as mythological burlesque, but he also wrote on philosophy, medicine, natural science, linguistics, and ethics. Among many other philosophical and moral lessons, Epicharmus taught that the continuous exercise of virtue could overcome heredity, so that anyone had the potential to be a good person regardless of birth. He died in his 90s (according to a statement in Lucian, he died at ninety-seven).

Diogenes Laërtius records that there was a bronze statue dedicated to him in Syracuse, by the inhabitants, for which Theocritus composed the following inscription:As the bright sun excels the other stars,As the sea far exceeds the river streams:So does sage Epicharmus men surpass,Whom hospitable Syracuse has crowned.Theocritus' Epigram 18 (AP IX 60; Kassel and Austin Test. 18) was written in his honour.

The cosmopolitan scientist and traveler Alexander von Humboldt turned Epicharmus into the protagonist of the only literary text he ever published; it appeared 1795 in Friedrich Schiller's journal Horen under the title "Die Lebenskraft oder der Rhodische Genius" [The Vital Force or the Rhodian Genius].  Epicharmos figures here as a natural philosopher and interpreter of art.

Works
Epicharmus wrote between thirty-five and fifty-two comedies, though many have been lost or exist only in fragments.  Along with his contemporary Phormis, he was alternately praised and denounced for ridiculing the great mythical heroes. At the time it would have been dangerous to present comedies in Syracuse like those of the Athenian stage, in which attacks were made upon the authorities. Accordingly, the comedies of Epicharmus are calculated not to give offence to the ruler. They are either mythological travesties or character comedies.

His two most famous works were Agrōstīnos ("The Country-Dweller," or "Clodhopper"), which dealt humorously with the rustic lifestyle, and Hebes Gamos ("The Marriage of Hebe"), in which Heracles was portrayed as a glutton. He also depicted Odysseus as an unheroic figure of burlesque by parodying the Homeric image for comic effect in his Odysseùs Autómolos (Ulysses the Deserter). Additional works include

Alkyon
Amykos ("Amycus")
Harpagai
Bakkhai
Bousiris ("Busiris")
Ga Kai Thalassa ("Earth and Sea")
Deukalion ("Deucalion")
Dionysoi ("The Dionysuses")
Diphilus
Elpis ("Hope"), or Ploutos ("Wealth")
Heorta kai Nasoi
Epinikios
Herakleitos ("Heraclitus")
Thearoi ("Spectators")
Hephaistos ("Hephaestus"), or Komastai ("The Revelers")
Kyklops ("The Cyclops")
Logos kai Logeina
Megaris ("Woman From Megara")
Menes ("Months")
Odysseus Nauagos ("Odysseus Shipwrecked")
Orya ("The Sausage")
Periallos
Persai ("The Persians")
Pithon ("The Little Ape" or "Monkey")
Seirenes ("Sirens")
Skiron
Sphinx
Triakades
Troes ("Trojan Men")
Philoktetes ("Philoctetes")
Choreuontes ("The Dancers")
Chytrai ("The Pots")

Reproducing a mid-4th century BC accusation from Alcimus, Diogenes Laërtius in his  Lives of Eminent Philosophers conserves a late opinion that Plato plagiarized several of Epicharmus's ideas. "[H]e [Plato] derived great assistance from Epicharmus the Comic poet, for he transcribed a great deal from him, as Alcimus says in the essays dedicated to Amyntas [of Heraclea]…." Laërtius then lists, in III, 10, the several ways that Plato "employs the words of Epicharmus."

Quotations
"A mortal should think mortal thoughts, not immortal thoughts."
"The best thing a man can have, in my view, is health."
"The hand washes the hand: give something and you may get something."
"Then what is the nature of men? Blown-up bladders!"
"Don't forget to exercise incredulity; for it is the sinews of the soul."

Notes

References
Philip Wentworth Buckham,  Theatre of the Greeks, 1827.
P.E. Easterling (Series Editor), Bernard M.W. Knox (Editor), Cambridge History of Classical Literature, v.I, Greek Literature, 1985. , cf. Chapter 12, p. 367 on Epicharmus and others.
Rudolf Kassel, C. Austin (Editor) Poetae Comici Graeci: Agathenor-Aristonymus (Poetae Comici Graeci), 1991.
 Lucía Rodríguez-Noriega Guillén, Epicarmo de Siracusa: testimonios y fragmentos, Oviedo: Universidad de Oviedo, Servicio de Publicaciones, 1996. (lxiv, 247 pages) ISBN 847468935X
A. W. Pickard-Cambridge, Dithyramb, Tragedy, and Comedy, Oxford: Clarendon Press, 1927, (repr. 1962).
Plato, Theaetetus.
William Ridgeway, contrib. The Dramas and Dramatic Dances of Non-European Races. Cambridge: Cambridge University Press, 1915.
Xavier Riu, Dionysism and Comedy, 1999. 
Lucia Rodríguez-Noriega Guillén, Epicarmo de Siracusa. Testimonios y Fragmentos. Edición crítica bilingüe.; Oviedo:  Universidad de Oviedo, Servicio de Publicaciones, 1996. Reviewed by Kathryn Bosher, University of Michigan, in Bryn Mawr Classical Review 2005.10.24
 Smith, William, Dictionary of Greek and Roman Biography and Mythology, 1870, article on Epicharmus, 
Theocritus, Idylls and Epigrams. (Theocritus translated into English Verse by C.S. Calverley)

External links
An article on Epicharmus at Theatrehistory.com

Epicharmus Fragments at demonax.info

540s BC births
450s BC deaths
Sicilian Greeks
Pythagoreans
Ancient Greek dramatists and playwrights
Ancient Greek poets
Ancient Koans
Doric Greek poets
Old Comic poets